Yapa may refer to:
 Yapa people, also known as Warlpiri, an ethnic group of Australia
 Yapa languages, an Australian language family

People with the name 
 Yapa-Hadda, 14th-century ruler of Beirut
 Anura Priyadharshana Yapa, Sri Lankan politician
 Mangala Yapa, Sri Lankan businessman
 Sugathapala Senarath Yapa, Sri Lankan film director
 Sunil Yapa, Sri Lankan American writer
 Upawansa Yapa, Sri Lankan lawyer

See also 
 Yuri Yappa, Russian physicist
 Iapa (disambiguation)

Sinhalese surnames
Sinhalese masculine given names